is a railway station in the city of Gosen, Niigata Prefecture, Japan, operated by the East Japan Railway Company (JR East).

Lines

Station layout
The station consists of one ground-level side platform serving a single bi-directional track. The station is unattended.

History
The station opened on 15 August 1955. With the privatization of Japanese National Railways (JNR) on 1 April 1987, the station came under the control of JR East. A new station building was completed in 2009.

Surrounding area
Saruwada Post Office
Gosen Kawahigashi Elementary School
Gosen Kawahigashi Middle School

External links

 JR East station information 

Railway stations in Niigata Prefecture
Ban'etsu West Line
Railway stations in Japan opened in 1955
Gosen, Niigata